Shane McCrae (born September 22, 1975, Portland, Oregon) is an American poet, and is currently Poetry Editor of Image.

McCrae was the recipient of a 2011 Whiting Award, and in 2012 his collection Mule was a finalist for the Kate Tufts Discovery Award and a PEN Center USA Literary Award. In 2013, McCrae received a fellowship from the National Endowment for the Arts.  He received a Lannan Literary Award in 2017, in 2018 his collection In the Language of My Captor won an Anisfield-Wolf Book Award, and in 2019 he was awarded a Guggenheim Fellowship.

His poems have appeared in numerous journals and anthologies, including Best American Poetry, American Poetry Review, African American Review, Fence, and AGNI.

Early life and education
Born in Portland, Oregon to a white mother and black father, his maternal grandparents kidnapped him when he was three years old and raised him to believe that his father had abandoned him. His grandfather was a white supremacist who abused him. They moved to California when he was 10 years old, and he grew up in Texas and California. He did not see his father again until he was 16.

He dropped out of high school and later earned a GED certificate and had a child at 18. He attended Chemeketa Community College. In 2002, McCrae graduated from Linfield College in McMinnville, Oregon. In 2004, he earned a Master of Fine Arts from the University of Iowa in Iowa City. In 2007, he graduated from Harvard Law School with a JD.  In 2012, he earned a Master of Arts from the University of Iowa.

Career
McCrae was an assistant professor in the Creative Writing program at Oberlin College 2015–2017 and is an assistant professor in the Creative Writing MFA program at Columbia University.

He is the author of the poetry collections Mule (Cleveland State University Poetry Center, 2011), Blood (Noemi Press, 2013), Forgiveness Forgiveness (Factory Hollow Press, 2014), The Animal Too Big to Kill (Persea Books, 2015), In the Language of My Captor (Wesleyan University Press, 2017),  The Gilded Auction Block (Farrar, Straus and Giroux, 2019), and Sometimes I Never Suffered (Farrar, Straus and Giroux, 2020).

Awards
In 2011, McCrae received the Whiting Award, and in 2012 his collection Mule was a finalist for the Kate Tufts Discovery Award and a PEN Center USA Literary Award.

The Animal Too Big to Kill won the 2014 Lexi Rudnitsky/Editor's Choice Award.

In the Language of My Captor was a finalist for the 2017 National Book Award and a winner of the 2018 Anisfield-Wolf Book Awards.

McCrae received a Lannan Literary Award in 2018, and a Guggenheim Fellowship in 2019.

Sometimes I Never Suffered was shortlisted for the 2020 T. S. Eliot Prize.

In 2020, McCrae received a NYSCA/NYFA Artist Fellowship.

Works 
 In Canaan, Milwaukee: Rescue Press, 2010. , 
 Mule, Cleveland: Cleveland State University Poetry Center, 2011. , 
 Blood, Noemi Press, 2013. , 
Nonfiction, Pittsburgh, PA: Black Lawrence Press, 2014. , 
Forgiveness Forgiveness, Hadley, MA: Factory Hollow Press, 2014. , 
 The Animal Too Big to Kill, New York: Persea Books, 2015. , 
In the Language of My Captor Middletown, Connecticut: Wesleyan University Press, 2017. , 
The Gilded Auction Block, New York: Farrar, Straus and Giroux, 2019. , 
 Sometimes I Never Suffered, New York: Farrar, Straus and Giroux, 2020. , 
 Cain Named the Animal, New York: Farrar, Straus and Giroux, 2022. ISBN 9780374602857, OCLC 1246143402

References

External links
 McCrae's Whiting Award Profile
 McCrae's Profile on The Cleveland State University Poetry Center Website
 McCrae on First Book Interviews Website

Living people
1975 births
American male poets
Poets from Oregon
Writers from Portland, Oregon
People from McMinnville, Oregon
Linfield University alumni
Iowa Writers' Workshop alumni
University of Iowa alumni
Harvard Law School alumni
Oberlin College faculty
Spalding University faculty
21st-century American poets
21st-century American male writers
Columbia University faculty